Maurice Fauget was a Canadian athletics official best known for taking the Judge's Oath at the 1976 Summer Olympics in Montreal, Quebec, Canada.

References
IOC 1976 Summer Olympics (shown as Maurice Forget)
Wendl, Karel. "The Olympic Oath - A Brief History" Citius, Altius, Fortius (Journal of Olympic History since 1997). Winter 1995. pp. 4,5.

External links
 

Canadian referees and umpires
Possibly living people
Year of birth missing
Olympic officials
Oath takers at the Olympic Games